The Judiciary of Sierra Leone is the branch of the Government of the Republic of Sierra Leone which interprets and applies the laws of Sierra Leone to ensure impartial justice under law and to provide a mechanism for dispute resolution. The independence of the judiciary is guaranteed by the constitution.

The judicial system, headed by the Chief Justice of Sierra Leone, comprises the inferior courts, represented by the Magistrates courts and the Local courts and the superior courts, represented by the High Court, the Court of Appeal and the Supreme Court.

Magistrate's Court

A Magistrate's Court exists for each judicial district with limited powers to do what is legally necessary to adjudicate on all civil and criminal matters arising within the district for which it is established. Such jurisdiction is exercised by the Magistrate duly appointed to the court.

Local Courts

Local courts administer customary law in provincial communities outside the Western Area.

The High Court of Justice

The High Court has supervisory jurisdiction over all inferior and traditional Courts in Sierra Leone.

The High Court consists of the Chief Justice and 9 puisne judges. A High Court hearing is duly constituted by any one judge of the High Court sitting with a jury.

The Court of Appeal

The Court of Appeal consists of the Chief Justice and not less than seven other justices. An Appeal Court hearing involves at least three justices of the Appeal Court. It hears appeals from lower courts.

The Supreme Court

The Supreme Court has final jurisdiction in all civil, criminal, and constitutional cases within Sierra Leone and its decisions cannot be appealed. The Supreme Court has the exclusive constitutional power to overturn the rulings of lower courts within the jurisdiction. It also has exclusive original jurisdiction  in matters relating to the enforcement or interpretation of any provision of the constitution and on whether an enactment has been made by Parliament or any other authority or person in excess of their power under the Constitution.

It consists of the Chief Justice and not less than four other justices. A Supreme Court hearing comprises not less than three justices of the Supreme Court.

Courts Martial

Courts Martial are empowered to try any person subject to military law, in addition to offences against the general law which are applicable to all persons who join the army. They can convened by the Force Commander or any General, Brigadier or Colonel or Officer of corresponding rank. A Court Martial consists of the President and not less than two other Officers, or in the trial of an Officer or Warrant Officer, no less than five other Officers.

Appointment of Judges

The Chief Justice and Judges of the Superior Court are appointed by the President of Sierra Leone acting on the advice of the Judicial and Legal Service Commission subject to the approval of Parliament. They can retire after reaching the age of 60 but must retire at the age of 65. They may be removed from office at any time in the event of misconduct or infirmity.

References

  
 

 
Law of Sierra Leone